Okenia purpurata is a species of sea slug, specifically a dorid nudibranch, a marine gastropod mollusc in the family Goniodorididae.

Distribution
This species was described from northern New South Wales, Australia. It is also known from Singapore.

Description
This Okenia has a narrow body and seven lateral papillae on each side and a single papilla in the middle of the back. The body is purple and the papillae are white. The rhinophores and gills are darker purple.

Ecology
The diet of this species is the ctenostome bryozoan Amathia tortuosa. It shares this food preference with Okenia vena which is very similar in shape but completely different in coloration.

References

Goniodorididae
Gastropods described in 2004